The 9th Asia Pacific Screen Awards were held in Brisbane, Australia on 26 November 2015.

Awards

Films and countries with multiple nominations

References

Asia Pacific Screen Awards
Asia Pacific Screen Awards
Asia Pacific Screen Awards
Asia Pacific Screen Awards